Cerro Cabrillo, also known locally as Cabrillo Peak, is a rocky mountain in eastern Morro Bay State Park, San Luis Obispo County, central California.

Geography

Cerro Cabrillo is one of the Nine Sisters, a group of nine volcanic landmarks in the area. Others include Morro Rock and Hollister Peak. It is named after Juan Rodríguez Cabrillo, a Spanish maritime explorer, who was sailing off the coast in 1542.

The rock outcrop, composed mostly of rhyodacite, is a volcanic plug formed when magma welled up underneath a layer of softer rock and solidified. The softer overlying rock has since eroded away, leaving a distinct, rugged shape.
On its east face is a rock formation named Tiki Rock, because of its resemblance to a Polynesian Tiki carving.

Access
The slopes and peak of Cerro Cabrillo are popular with hikers and rock climbers, with trailheads in Morro Bay State Park.

Its slopes support many chaparral and coastal sage scrub wild flowers, such as Deer Weed (Acmispon glaber), Soap plant (Chlorogalum pomeridianum), and Chaparral checkerbloom (Sidalcea hickmanii).

See also
Morro Bay State Park

References

External links
 
 Hikespeak.com: "Cerro Cabrillo and Tiki Rock in Morro Bay State Park" — with photos.

Nine Sisters
Morro Bay
Mountains of San Luis Obispo County, California
Mountains of Southern California
Volcanic plugs of California